Park Yeong-sun or Pak Yong-sun may refer to:
 Pak Yong-sun (politician) (c. 1905/1909?–1987), North Korean male politician
 Pak Yung-sun (1956–1987), North Korean female table tennis player
 Park Young-soon (born 1985), South Korean female field hockey player